Since I Left Your World is the fourth release and first extended play (EP) by the American indie rock band Rookie of the Year, released through 111 Records on November 17, 2009. The EP is a follow-up to 2008's Sweet Attention and contains elements from the album as well as previous albums The Goodnight Moon (2006), and Having To Let Go (2005). The songwriting team of Ryan Dunson and Mike Kamerman fuse acoustic and folk rock with a modern American indie rock sound.

Track listing
 "Since I Left Your World" — 3:31
 "Slow Down" — 3:13
 "...And We Sing the Melody" — 3:30
 "Hey Lauren" — 3:53
 "Eighty Eight Keys" — 3:51

Band members
 Ryan Dunson - Vocals, acoustic guitar
 Mike Kamerman - Guitars, backing vocals
 Daniel Kerrigan - Piano, synths, pads
Additional Musicians
 Zach Reichart - Guitar
 Brian Davitt - Bass
 Jordan Young -  Drums (Joined in October 2009, before the release)
 Tyler Humphrey - Drums, percussion (Listed within the insert, but was not in the band when the EP was released)

References

External links

111 Records

Rookie of the Year (band) albums
2009 albums